The Belgian Albums Chart, divided into the two main regions Flanders and Wallonia, ranks the best-performing albums in Belgium, as compiled by Ultratop.


Flanders

Wallonia

See also
 List of Ultratop 50 number-one singles of 2023

References

Number one albums
Belgium Albums
Belgian record charts